Orthocomotis melania is a species of moth of the family Tortricidae. It is found on Jamaica.

References

Moths described in 1956
Orthocomotis